William II of Isenburg-Wied (German: Wilhelm II. von Isenburg-Wied) was the Count of Isenburg-Braunsberg from 1383 until 1388, and the Count of Isenburg-Wied from 1388 until 1409. William renamed his state Isenburg-Wied in 1388.

1409 deaths
House of Isenburg
Year of birth unknown
Place of birth unknown